Forest Township is a township in Winnebago County, Iowa, in the USA.

History
Forest Township was founded in 1857.

References

Townships in Winnebago County, Iowa
Townships in Iowa
1857 establishments in Iowa
Populated places established in 1857